Loyalty and Betrayal may refer to:

Loyalty & Betrayal: The Story of the American Mob, a 1994 documentary film
Loyalty and Betrayal (Against album), or the title song
Loyalty and Betrayal (E-40 album), or the title song